The Washington Square Bar & Grill was a landmark restaurant adjoining Washington Square in San Francisco's North Beach neighborhood (Powell at Union streets). Known widely as the Washbag, so named by columnist Herb Caen as a play on words, it was a favorite gathering place for a generation of writers, politicians, musicians, and social elite.

The restaurant was opened in 1973 by local Ed Moose, a former dispatcher and reporter for the St. Louis Post-Dispatch, his wife Mary Etta, and partner Sam Dietsch. Moose organized a softball team, the Lapins Sauvages, composed of famous and influential people who were regular restaurant patrons. Caen often wrote of the team's exploits in his newspaper columns, describing its travels to play in major stadiums in various locations around the world. In 1989 author Ron Fimrite, another of the softball team members, wrote The Square: the Story of a Saloon, describing the restaurant's place in San Francisco's cocktail culture.

In 1990 the partners sold the restaurant. Ed and Mary Etta, with Sam Dietsch as a silent partner, opened a larger restaurant, Moose's, on the opposite side of the square.  The new restaurant soon took on the same local cultural significance for San Francisco.

The Washbag was sold to new partners in 2000, closed on January 1, 2008, then reopened from March 2, 2009, under new owners, closing in August 2010, the week of Ed Moose's death.

References

Defunct restaurants in the San Francisco Bay Area
History of San Francisco
North Beach, San Francisco
Restaurants established in 1973
Restaurants in San Francisco